The 2016 Road to the Kentucky Oaks was a points system by which three-year-old fillies qualified for the 2016 Kentucky Oaks. The point system replaced a previous qualifying system which was based on graded stakes earnings.

For the 2016 series, the points awarded to the top 4 finishers of the Breeders Cup Juvenile Fillies were doubled to a 20-8-4-2 basis. Otherwise the series was supposed to remain the same as 2015, with 31 total races. However, due to an outbreak of equine herpesvirus at Sunland Parks, the Sunland Park Oaks was not run, reducing the number of races to 30.

Songbird was the highest ranked filly with 190 points, earned by winning the Chandelier (10 points), Juvenile Fillies (20 points), Las Virgenes (10 points), Santa Ysabel (50 points) and Santa Anita Oaks (100 points). She would have been the heavy favorite for the Oaks but developed a fever and did not race.

Cathryn Sophia, the winner of the 2016 Oaks, qualified for the race with 80 points, earned by winning the Forward Gal Stakes (10 points) and Davona Dale Stakes (50 points) plus finishing 3rd in the Ashland (20 points).

Standings

Prep season

Championship Series

References

Kentucky Oaks
Road to the Kentucky Oaks
Road to the Kentucky Oaks